Peak Military Care Network (PMCN) is a nonprofit based in Colorado Springs Colorado. Founded in 2004, PMCN’s mission is to connect military service members, veterans and their families to community resources in the Colorado.

History 

PMCN was created in 2004 as the National Homeland Defense Foundation. Founded was proved by the El Pomar Foundation. In 2015, the National Homeland Defense Foundation relaunched as the Peak Military Care Network. Their goal is to connect military members and veterans with services in their community. The Pikes Peak is the only region to house a major Army installation (Fort Carson), three Air Force installations (Peterson Air Force Base, Schriever Air Force Base and Cheyenne Mountain Air Force Station), and a leading service academy (U.S. Air Force Academy). One in four residents in the Pikes Peak area is a military member or veteran.

Services 

PMCN provides a number of services and has a wide network of partners.

The services provided are:

 Advocacy
 Behavior Health
 Caregiver Support
 Child & Family Services
 Crisis Intervention
 Workforce Readiness
 Educational Services
 Financial & Benefits Assistance
 Housing Assistance
 Health Services
 Social Services
 Substance Abuse Treatment
 Transition and Reintegration Assistance
 Utility Service Assistance

Partners 

PMCN has partnered with more than 40 organizations to provide an expansive network of care.

Their partner agencies include:

 Amblicab
 American Red Cross
 Angels of America’s Fallen
 AspenPointe Health Services
 CASA
 Cedar Springs Hospital
 CPCD
 Goodwill
 El Paso County Department of Human Services
 Veterans Service Office
 Employer Support of the Guard and Reserve
 Family Care Center
 SET Family Medical Clinics
 Freedom Service Dogs
 Give An Hour
 Mt. Carmel Center of Excellence of Colorado
 University of Colorado Colorado Springs
 Onward to Opportunity
 Operation Homefront
 Operation TBI Freedom
 Peak View Behavior Health
 Peak Vista Community Health Centers
 Pikes Peak Area Council of Governments
 The Phoenix
 Pikes Peak State College
 Pikes Peak Restorative Justice Council
 Pikes Peak Suicide Prevention
 Pikes Peak Therapeutic Riding Center
 United Way
 Pikes Peak Workforce Center
 Project Sanctuary 
 Rocky Mountain Human Services
 Silver Key Senior
 TESSA
 Home Front Cares
 The Independence Center
 The Resource Exchange
 The Strum Center at the University of Denver
 USO
 Pikes Peak Community College
 Veterans Squaring Away Veterans
 YMCA

References

External links 
 Official site

2004 establishments in Colorado
Organizations based in Colorado Springs, Colorado
Non-profit organizations based in Colorado
Military-related organizations